Hawdon is a surname originating in the north of England and may refer to:

People
Dickie Hawdon (1927–2009), English jazz trumpeter and member of the Yorkshire Jazz Band
John Hawdon (sculler) (b. 1852), British rower
John Hawdon (colonial settler) (1801–1881), pioneering settler in Australia, and older brother of Joseph Hawdon
Joseph Hawdon (1813–1871), pioneering settler in Australia and New Zealand
Matthias Hawdon (1732–1789), English organist and composer

Fiction
Captain Hawdon, a character in Bleak House by Charles Dickens
Frank Hawdon, a character in the 1979 film My Brilliant Career

Places
Hawdon River, New Zealand (named for Joseph Hawdon)
Lake Hawdon (disambiguation), several places in Australia and New Zealand (named for Joseph Hawdon)

Surnames of English origin